The Allegheny Trail is a  hiking trail that passes through the Allegheny Mountains in West Virginia, United States. It is the longest named trail in the state excepting the Appalachian Trail,  of which traverses the state at Harper's Ferry.

The trail is not yet complete, and substantial sections are still on roads.  It was initiated in 1975, and is being built and maintained by the West Virginia Scenic Trails Association.

The northern terminus of the Allegheny Trail is near Bruceton Mills at the Mason–Dixon line, which here represents the boundary between West Virginia and Pennsylvania.  The trail ends at the Appalachian Trail on Peters Mountain on the Virginia – West Virginia border.
In 2021, Michael Green aka "Boomerang" became the first hiker to complete the trail in winter, hiking the entire trail from December 5, 2020 to January 15, 2021.

References
Rosier, George L., Compiler, Hiking Guide to the Allegheny Trail, Second edition, West Virginia Scenic Trails Association, Kingwood, W.Va., 1990.

External links
West Virginia Scenic Trails Association

Hiking trails in West Virginia
Long-distance trails in the United States
Great Eastern Trail